NICMAR has spread its wings to become the First Built Environment University in INDIA. NICMAR University, Pune Act, 2022 (Mah. Act No. XXXVI of 2022), published in “Maharashtra Government Gazette”, on the 12th May 2022. Recognized as State Private University by UGC.https://www.ugc.ac.in/oldpdf/Private%20University/Consolidated_List_Private_Universities.pdf

NICMAR recognized by the Department of Scientific and Industrial Research, Ministry of Science and Technology, Government of India as a Scientific and Industrial Research Organization (SIRO) and is headquartered at Walchand Centre, Tardeo, Mumbai, India. Main campus being at Pune, Maharashtra.

Profile 
NICMAR was founded in 1983 as a result of a joint effort by a group of major construction companies in India headed by Hindustan Construction Company (HCC) whose Chairman, Ajit Gulabchand, put forth the idea of setting up an advanced research centre in construction management. HCC contributed  30,000,000 towards the setting up of the proposed institute. The result was the establishment of the institute with headquarters at Walchand Centre, Tardeo in Mumbai.

The University has a mandate to provide a platform for advanced research and training on the subject and for dissemination of knowledge through print and audiovisual media, conferences and seminars. It also undertakes projects on behalf of other organizations. 

In 1990, NICMAR was accredited by the Department of Scientific and Industrial Research, Ministry of Science and Technology as a Scientific and Industrial Research Organization (SIRO). Advanced Construction Management Program, a higher studies program conducted by NICMAR in association with Massachusetts Institute of Technology, International Labour Organization and Indian Institute of Management, Ahmedabad is considered to be a premium education program by the industry. The program is funded by UNDP and has visiting faculty from MIT, University of Michigan, University of Loughborough, and IIMA as per agreements with the respective organizations.

Facilities
NICMAR maintains a library at its main campus in Pune which stocks more than 40000 printed materials by way of reference books, bound volumes, journals and other international publications and reference materials in digital media. It also keeps references on national and international standards such as Bureau of Indian Standards, Indian Roads Congress, International Federation of Consulting Engineers, Geneva, (FIDIC) and International Labour Organization, Geneva.

The collections include 25000 books and theses, 10000 bound volumes of journals and 5000 e-references in the form of compact discs. It also subscribes to 79 periodicals and 9 newspapers such as Proquest ABI Inform, ebrary-Business and Economics, ASCE Journals, ASCE Proceedings, SCIENCEDIRECT – Business, Management and Accounting, Sage Journals, CMIE Prowess, CMIE Industry Outlook, CMIE Economic Outlook and CMIE Capex.

The other infrastructural facilities include Classrooms, Computer Labs, Conference Halls, Auditorium, Open Air Theatre, Student's Hostel, Executive Hostel, Dining Facility, Indoor and Outdoor Sports and Wi-Fi Facility.

Associations and collaborations
NICMAR has entered into collaborative associations with several organizations of national and international repute working in the fields of construction, real estate, projects and infrastructure.

 Knowledge Partnership: With The Economic Times, Construction Week magazine and CREDAI
 NICMAR is associating Bentley Education .
 NICMAR is associating with Construction World magazine for recognizing excellence of construction companies based on a rating program developed by NICMAR, called Construction World NICMAR Award for the most admired company in the field of construction.
 PMI Organisation Centre Private Limited, a subsidiary of Project Management Institute (PMI) has placed an endowment at NICMAR for promoting research excellence by awarding two scholarships to the best students at NICMAR.
 NICMAR is an alliance member of the Microsoft Dynamics Academic Alliance for the use of Microsoft ERP programs and has set up a Construction ERP laboratory in Pune campus, known to be the first of its kind in India.
 NICMAR utilises the services of the Construction Computer Software (CCS), South Africa for project estimation and control by way of CANDY, an industry specific software developed by CCS.
 Palisade EMEA and India, a subsidiary of Palisade Corporation, UK, is a software partner of NICMAR for the use of "Decision Tools Suite Industrial, an ERP software for risk analysis.

Courses

NICMAR offers several MBA & post graduate level courses in the field of project engineering and construction management, Real Estate, Infrastructure, Project and Management areas. It also conducts short, medium and long term programs for executive development, primarily aimed at construction industry. The longer duration programs are based at Pune and Hyderabad campuses .At the end of every year, Invites application for all its courses.
.

MBA in Advanced Construction Management (ACM) 
Change the face of the world of construction with this interdisciplinary postgraduate program designed to prepare for a stellar management career. Cutting-edge practical and technical skills to manage people and large-scale projects within the construction industry.

MBA in Advanced Project Management (APM) 
This comprehensive program allows to acquire all the necessary skills need to take the reins of the biggest, most complex engineering and non-engineering projects, and see to success.

Integrated Masters of Business Administration (IMBA) 
A comprehensive management program designed for the leaders of tomorrow, the I-MBA program is spread across ten semesters over a period of five years.

Postgraduate Diploma in Management of Family-owned Construction Business (PGD MFOCB) 
The groundwork for to enhance business acumen, technical skills, and develop extraordinary leadership abilities - all of which help family business to the next level.

Postgraduate Diploma in Quantity Surveying and Construction Management (PGD QSCM) 
Learn how to manage and control the cost aspects, mitigate risks, ensure regulatory and policy compliance, and make way for sustainable practices across the realm.

MBA in Real Estate and Urban Infrastructure Management (MBA REUIM) 
Venture into the urban infrastructural sector as a professional with futuristic insights. Spread across four exciting semesters, this sought-after postgraduate program develops leaders that make solid contributions to the nation's economic progress.

The objective of the all programmes is to develop a professional techno-managerial leader with the potential to manage complex infrastructure projects and organisations in India and globally, with distinct competencies in project evaluation and appraisal, infrastructure project planning, financing, design, control and monitoring construction, project execution, operation and maintenance etc., so as to improve the economic, environmental and social sustainability of the infrastructure systems.

Executive Education
NICMAR has put in place an inservice program executive development program, open to executives working in the construction and related industries, government departments and other interested corporate entities. The program is designed to provide the executives with higher managerial and technical skills.

Distance Education
NICMAR offers various programs by distance education mode. The courses were discontinued in January 2018 after the November 2017 Supreme Court ruling that technical education cannot be provided through distance learning or correspondence courses.

Two Year Post Graduate Distance Education Programs           
 Post Graduate Program in Construction Management (PGP CM)
 Post Graduate Program in Project Management (PGP PM)
 Post Graduate Program in Infrastructure Development and Management (PGP IDM)
 Post Graduate Program in Construction Business Management (PGP CBM)
 Post Graduate Program in Real Estate Management (PGP REM)
 Post Graduate Program in Quantity Surveying (PGP QS)
 Post Graduate Program in Health, Safety and Environment Management (PGP HSEM)

One Year Part Time Week-end Post Graduate Programs
 Post Graduate Program in Quantity Surveying and Contract Management (PGP QSCM)
 Post Graduate Program in Construction Management for Working Executives (PGP CMWE)
 Post Graduate Program in Project Management for Working Executives (PGP PMWE)
 Post Graduate Program in Facilities Management for Working Executives (PGP FMWE).

Graduate Programs
 Graduate Program in Construction Project Management (GP PM)
 Graduate Program in Construction Business Management (GP CBM)
 Graduate Program in Construction Safety Management (GP CSM)
 Graduate Program in Construction Quantity Surveying (GP QS)
 Graduate Program in Power Sector Project Management (GP PSPM)
 Graduate Program in Contract Administration and Dispute Management(GP CADM)

Centres

NICMAR PUNE Campus
The campus of NICMAR Pune is at Balewadi, in Pune, along the Mumbai-Bangalore Expressway, on a land measuring 11 acres of land, with a total built up area of 377,676 sq ft. The campus hosts the administration and faculty offices, various classrooms, library, computer centre, dining hall, auditorium and a documentation centre. It also provides facilities such as medical clinic, community hall and indoor and outdoor recreational areas.

NICMAR HYDERABAD Campus
NICMAR Hyderabad (Shamirpet) campus is situated at Shamirpet, 30 kilometres away from the Secunderabad Railway Station and 7 kilometres from Ratnalayam Temple which is on the Karimnagar highway. It has over 3,34,609 square feet built-up area on a 31.46 acre plot of land.

Publications
The Institute publishes a periodical, Journal of Construction Management for dissemination of information on modern technologies in construction management.

See also

 Construction engineering
 Construction management

References

External links

 on WorldCat
 News report on The Economic Times.
 Top 5 Construction Management Colleges in India 2019

Higher education in India
Construction management
Project Management Institute
Construction industry of India